A – B – C – D – E – F – G – H – I – J – K – L – M – N – O – P – Q – R – S – T – U – V – W – XYZ

This is a list of rivers in the United States that have names starting with the letter W.  For the main page, which includes links to listings by state, see List of rivers in the United States.

Wa 
Wabash River – Ohio, Indiana, Illinois
Waccamaw River – North Carolina, South Carolina
Waccasassa River – Florida
Wacissa River – Florida
Wading River – Massachusetts
Wading River – New Jersey
Wailua River – Hawaii
Wailuku River – Hawaii
Waimea River – Hawaii
Waits River – Vermont
Wakarusa River – Kansas
Wakatomika Creek – Ohio
Wakulla River – Florida
Walhonding River – Ohio
Walker Creek – California
Walker Creek – Michigan
Walker Creek – Virginia
Walker Creek – West Virginia
Walker River – Nevada
Walla Walla River – Washington
Wallkill River – New Jersey, New York
Walloomsac River – Vermont, New York
Wallooskee River – Oregon
Wallowa River – Oregon
Walnut River – Kansas
Wanaque River – New Jersey
Wando River – South Carolina
Wankinco River – Massachusetts
Wappinger Creek – New York
Wapsipinicon River – Iowa
Ware River – Massachusetts
Warm Springs River – Oregon
Warner River – New Hampshire
Warren River – Rhode Island
Warwick River – Virginia
Washita River – Texas, Oklahoma
Washougal River – Washington
Watab River – Minnesota
Watauga River – North Carolina, Tennessee
Wateree River – South Carolina
Watonwan River – Minnesota
Waupaca River – Wisconsin
Waxahatchee Creek – Alabama

We 
Weber River – Utah
Webhannet River – Maine
Weeki Wachee River – Florida
Weiser River – Idaho
Wekiva River – Florida
Wells River – Vermont
Wenatchee River – Washington
West River – Connecticut
West River – Maryland
West River – Massachusetts
West River – Rhode Island
West River – Vermont
West Branch – New Hampshire
West Branch Delaware River – New York, Pennsylvania
West Branch Susquehanna River – Pennsylvania
West Branch Wading River – New Jersey
West Fork River – West Virginia
West Fork of the Little Sioux River – Iowa
West Nishnabotna River – Iowa
West Okaw River – Illinois
West Twin River – Wisconsin
West Walker River – California, Nevada
Westfield River – Massachusetts
Westport River – Massachusetts
Weweantic River – Massachusetts
Weymouth Back River – Massachusetts
Weymouth Fore River – Massachusetts

Wh 
Wheeling Creek – Ohio
Wheeling Creek – West Virginia
Whetstone River – South Dakota, Minnesota
Whippany River – New Jersey
White River – Arkansas, Missouri
White River – Indiana
White River – Western Michigan
White River – The Thumb of Michigan
White River – Nevada
White River – Oregon
White River – South Dakota, Nebraska
White River – Colorado, Utah
White River – Utah
White River – Vermont
White River (Puyallup River) – Washington
White River (Lake Wenatchee) – Washington
White River – Wisconsin (Bad River tributary)
White River – Wisconsin (Fox River tributary)
White Chuck River – Washington
White Clay Creek – Pennsylvania, Delaware
White Earth River – Minnesota
White Earth River – North Dakota
White Oak Bayou – Texas
White Oak River – North Carolina
White Rock Creek – Texas
White Salmon River – Washington
Whiteface River – Minnesota
Whiteface River – New Hampshire
Whitefish River – Michigan
Whitefish River – Montana
Whitewater River – California
Whitewater River – Indiana, Ohio
Whitewater River – Kansas
Whitewater River – Minnesota
Whitewater River – North Carolina, South Carolina

Wi 
Wichita River – Texas
Wicomico River – Maryland (Chesapeake Bay)
Wicomico River – Maryland (Potomac River)
Wild River – New Hampshire and Maine
Wild Ammonoosuc River – New Hampshire
Wild Rice River – Minnesota
Wild Rice River – North Dakota
Wilde River – Massachusetts
Willamette River – Oregon
Willapa River – Washington
Williams Fork (Colorado River) – Colorado
Williams Fork (Yampa River) – Colorado
Williams River – Vermont
Williams River – West Virginia
Williamson River – Oregon
Willimantic River – Connecticut
Willis River – Virginia
Willow Creek – Colorado
Willow Creek – Montana
Willow River – Minnesota, tributary of Kettle River
Willow River – Minnesota, tributary of Mississippi River
Willow River – Wisconsin (St. Croix River tributary)
Willow River – Wisconsin (Tomahawk River tributary)
Wills Creek – Ohio
Wills Creek – Pennsylvania, Maryland
Wilson River – Oregon
Wind River – Alaska
Wind River – Wisconsin
Wind River – Washington
Wind River – Wyoming
Wing River – Minnesota
Winnebago River – Iowa
Winnetuxet River – Massachusetts
Winnicut River – New Hampshire
Winnipesaukee River – New Hampshire
Winooski River – Vermont
Wisconsin River – Wisconsin
Wise River – Montana
Wishkah River – Washington
Wissahickon Creek – Pennsylvania
Witcher Creek – West Virginia
Withlacoochee River – southern Florida
Withlacoochee River – Georgia and northern Florida

Wo – Wy 
Wolf Creek (Great Miami River) – Ohio
Wolf Creek (Muskingum River) – Ohio
Wolf River – Kansas
Wolf River – Mississippi, Tennessee
Wolf River – Tennessee, Kentucky
Wolf River – Wisconsin (Eau Claire River tributary)
Wolf River – Wisconsin (Fox River tributary)
Wonalancet River – New Hampshire
Wood River – Illinois
Wood River – Oregon
Wood River – Connecticut, Rhode Island
Wood River – Wisconsin
Woonasquatucket River – Rhode Island
Worthington Creek – West Virginia
Wounded Knee Creek – South Dakota
Wulik River – Alaska
Wye River – Maryland
Wynoochee River – Washington

W